John Thomas Curtin (August 24, 1921 – April 14, 2017) was a United States district judge of the United States District Court for the Western District of New York from 1967 to 2017 and its Chief Judge from 1974 to 1989.

Early life and military service

Born in Buffalo, New York, Curtin was in the United States Marine Corps during World War II, from 1942 to 1945, achieving the rank of lieutenant colonel. He flew 35 combat missions during the war and survived a crash landing in the Pacific. He received a Bachelor of Science degree from Canisius College in 1946 and a Bachelor of Laws from the University of Buffalo Law School in 1949. He was in the United States Marine Corps Reserve from 1952 to 1954. Curtin was in private practice in Buffalo from 1949 to 1961, and was then the United States Attorney for the Western District of New York from 1961 to 1967.

Federal judicial service
On November 28, 1967, Curtin was nominated by President Lyndon B. Johnson to a new seat on the United States District Court for the Western District of New York created by 80 Stat. 75. He was confirmed by the United States Senate on December 14, 1967, and received his commission the same day. He served as chief judge from 1974 to 1989, assuming senior status on July 1, 1989.

Notable case

In 1976, Curtin ruled on the case Arthur v. Nyquist, which effected the integration of the Buffalo Public School District. He ruled that schools were "deliberately segregated" and that they would need to begin desegregation efforts immediately. The plaintiffs in this case were a group of concerned parents and Buffalo Common Council member George Arthur. The defendants were the Buffalo Public School District, the City of Buffalo and New York State Commissioner of Education Ewald Nyquist.

Retirement and death

Curtin took inactive senior status on April 12, 2016, at the age of 94. He died on April 14, 2017, at the age of 95, in Buffalo, New York. He was survived by his wife, Jane Good, whom he married in 1952, as well as seven children. His wife died on March 12, 2018.

See also
 List of United States federal judges by longevity of service

References

Sources
 

1921 births
2017 deaths
Lawyers from Buffalo, New York
Military personnel from New York (state)
Judges of the United States District Court for the Western District of New York
United States district court judges appointed by Lyndon B. Johnson
20th-century American judges
United States Attorneys for the Western District of New York
Canisius College alumni
University at Buffalo Law School alumni
United States Marine Corps officers
United States Marine Corps personnel of World War II